Sonans Utdanning is a private educational institution offering general subjects at upper secondary (akin to high school) level and vocational school in Norway. It was established in 1989 in Stavanger, Norway under the name Stavanger Private Gymnas, which later developed into a chain of independent schools across Norway. The institution has 8500 students annually, and focuses on candidates who want to complete or improve grades from high school, or obtain study competencies in order to be admitted into higher education and reach specific study goals.

Branches
The school has branches in Bergen, Bodø, Drammen, Fredrikstad, Hamar, Kristiansand, Lillestrøm, Oslo, Porsgrunn, Sandvika, Ski, Stavanger, Trondheim,  Tønsberg, and Tromsø.

Sonans Gruppen AS
Sonans Gruppen AS consists of two main branches within the fields of education and work: 

 Sonans Utdanning (Sonans Privat Gymnas)
 Bjørknes Høyskole - a private college that was established as a separate registered entity in 2007 and offers higher education in health sciences and social sciences.

External links
  Official website in Norwegian.

Schools in Norway
Educational institutions established in 1989
1989 establishments in Norway